USS Sparrow (AMCU-42/LCIL-1098) was an  built for the U.S. Navy for the task of landing troops in combat areas.

The second ship to be named Sparrow by the Navy was laid down as LCI(L)-1098, a large, infantry landing craft, on 4 October 1944 by the Defoe Shipbuilding Company in Bay City, Michigan; launched on 17 October 1944; and commissioned on 23 October 1944.

World War II service 

LCI(L)-1098 made her way through Lake Michigan and the Chicago Drainage Canal, down the Illinois River and the Mississippi river, and arrived at New Orleans, Louisiana, on 12 November 1944.  She drydocked at New Orleans, then commenced her shakedown cruise to Galveston, Texas.  After completing shakedown and amphibious training, she departed Galveston on 6 December 1944.

Transfer to the Pacific Theatre 

She transited the Panama Canal on 13 December, and arrived in San Diego, California, on the 27 December.  On 11 March 1945, following further exercises and training at San Diego, LCI(L)-1098 got underway for Pearl Harbor, Hawaii, en route to Guam in the Marianas.  She entered Pearl Harbor and departed soon thereafter, visiting Eniwetok Atoll along the way to the Marianas.  She arrived at Guam on 8 April.

She was assigned harbor patrol and escort duties in the Marianas on 25 April and remained so engaged until 16 December, when she sailed back toward the United States. LCI (L)-1098 stopped at Pearl Harbor from 28 December 1945 until 3 January 1946. She made San Diego on the 15th and remained there for almost a month. On 12 March, she departed San Diego, sailed via the Panama Canal for New Orleans, and arrived there on 2 April. On 5 June 1946, LCI (L)-1098 was placed out of commission, in reserve, and berthed at Green Cove Springs, Florida.

Redesignation 

LCI(L)-1098 remained in reserve until October 1953. During this period, she changed designations twice. On 28 February 1949, she was redesignated a large infantry landing ship, LSI(L)-1098. LSI(L)-1098 became a coastal minesweeper and was named Sparrow (AMCU-42) on 7 March 1952; then she moved to Charleston, S.C., for the actual conversion.

Reactivation in 1953 as AMCU-42 

On 23 October 1953, the ship was commissioned as Sparrow (AMCU-42).  a month and a day later, she reported to the Commandant, 3d Naval District, for duty. Over the next 18 months, Sparrow operated along the east coast of the United States, from Key West, to New London, Connecticut.

Final deactivation and decommissioning 

On 7 February 1955, Sparrow was redesignated a coastal mine hunter, MHC-42, and on 12 April, she was placed in commission, in reserve, at Charleston. In July 1958, Sparrow moved to Mayport, Florida; and, on 1 January 1960, her name was struck from the Navy list.

Military awards and honors 

Sparrow (LCI(L)-1098) the American Campaign Medal - Asiatic-Pacific Campaign Medal - World War II Victory Medal
for World War II service and National Defense Service Medal as AMCU-41.

References

External links 
 Dictionary of American Naval Fighting Ships
 NavSource Online: Mine Warfare Vessel Photo Archive - LCI(L)-1098 - Sparrow (AMCU / MHC 42)

 

AMCU-7-class minesweepers
Ships built in Bay City, Michigan
1944 ships
World War II amphibious warfare vessels of the United States
Korean War amphibious warfare vessels of the United States
Cold War mine warfare vessels of the United States